The British Heavyweight Championship is a top  British wrestling championship found throughout the country's circuit. The championship was recognised and defended on matches screened by UK national television network ITV as part of the professional wrestling slot on World of Sport as well as standalone broadcasts.  Pre-publicity for these championship match broadcasts was given in ITV's nationally published listings magazine TVTimes.

Many versions of the British Heavyweight Championship exist in the wrestling circuit of the United Kingdom at any given time.

Title histories
This is the combined list of different versions of the British Heavyweight Titles, each of which was probably the most significant version at the time. Each version may or may not be connected to another. However, all title changes are either actual or "official" unless indicated otherwise.
Key

British Wrestling Association 1930–1950 

Disputed claims 1934-1938

Joint Promotions 1952–1982 & 1985–1989

Disputed Branch: British Wrestling Federation 1958–1966

All Star Wrestling 1974, 1982–present

Disputed Branch: The Wrestling Alliance 1999–2003

Footnotes

Universal British Heavyweight Championship 
On 10 July 2002 All-Star's Champion, Doug Williams along with other top title holding wrestlers entered into a tournament to be recognised as Universal British Heavyweight Champion by The Wrestling Alliance, Frontier Wrestling Alliance, World Association of Wrestling, All Star Wrestling, and Premier Promotions.  Doug Williams would first defeat the then-TWA British Heavyweight Champion, Justin Starr (though Starr would continue to be recognised as champion), before going on to defeat The Zebra Kid in a tournament final to become the Universal British Heavyweight Champion.

The Universal version of this title would not last long with all the promotions splitting out their British Heavyweight titles, but Williams continued to be recognised as the Universal British Heavyweight Champion.

See also

Professional wrestling in the United Kingdom
 FWA/XWA British Heavyweight Championship

References

External links
 wrestling-titles.com
 solie.org (title histories)
 Wrestling Information Archive

Heavyweight wrestling championships
Professional wrestling in the United Kingdom
National professional wrestling championships
National championships in the United Kingdom